Iranian hip hop (Persian: هیپ‌هاپ ایرانی), also known to as Persian hip hop (هیپ‌هاپ فارسی), refers to hip hop music developed in Iran (Persia) and in Persian language. It is rooted in American hip hop culture, but it has sometimes incorporated local elements such as Iranian classical music and literature.

History
Iranian hip hop originates from Tehran, the country's capital city, although a number of experimental works were recorded earlier by diasporan Iranian musicians, particularly in Los Angeles. Iranian rappers started out by recording mixtapes. Some combined hip hop with Iranian elements, such as Iran's classical music. Hip hop music in Iran has often been an underground movement. On several occasions, recording studios have been shut down, websites have been blocked, and artists have been arrested. Only a few works have been officially approved by the Ministry of Culture and Islamic Guidance. Hip hop dance is also present in underground movements, with few performances having received limited permission.

Iran's premier rap group, 021, named after the telephone area code of Tehran, was founded during the late 1990s. Hichkas, the lead figure of this group, came to be one of Iran's earliest renowned rappers, and therefore nicknamed the Father of Persian Rap. His well-received album Jangale Asfalt ("Asphalt Jungle"), produced by Mahdyar Aghajani, was the first Iranian hip hop album. It incorporated a fusion with traditional Persian harmonies and contributed remarkably to the evolution of hip hop in Iran. Hichkas co-founded 021 music group with  Yashar and Shayan duo but they later separated from the group and created their own group renamed Vaajkhonyaa. Hichkas, Mehrak Reveal, Reza Pishro, Ali Quf, Ashkan Fadaei and Mahdyar Aghajani became the prominent members of 021.

Zedbazi, founded officially in April 2002, is regarded as the pioneer of gangsta rap in Iran. The band quickly gained a huge popularity among the youth, due mainly to their use of explicit lyrics, littered with profanity and depictions of sex and drug use. They are credited with starting a new movement in Iranian music.

Bahram Nouraei, who was once arrested, was listed as one of the "50 People Shaping The Culture Of The Middle East" by HuffPost in August 2012. His most popular work, Inja Irane ("Here is Iran"), was described as a "poignant critique of the country" by Rolling Stone. 

Amir tataloo is most popular Iranian singer in the rap and R and B . He has been active in different styles of music .

Yas was the first Iranian rapper to be authorized to perform in Iran. He reached national fame through his song CD ro Beshkan ("Break the Disk"), which was written about an Iranian actress who was subjected to a sex tape scandal. On 21 December 2011, he was chosen by voters as the "Artist of the Week" on MTV, entitled "Tehran's Hard-Hitting MC". 

The restrictions have been more stringent on women. Salome MC, who started her career collaborating with Hichkas, was one of the first women to contribute to Iranian hip hop. She was named as an influential and "revolutionizing" artist by MTV and Time.

Samples

See also
 Music of Iran
 Graffiti in Iran
 Dance in Iran
 List of Iranian hip hop artists

References

 
Hip hop